Bǔ (卜) is a Chinese surname. It is the 210th most common Chinese surname, being shared by 510,000 or 0.038% of the population, with Jiangsu being the province with the most people. It is the 92nd name on the Hundred Family Surnames poem.

Notable people
 Bu Xiangzhi (卜祥志; born 1985) is a Chinese chess player. In 1999, he became the 10th grandmaster from China
 Bu Tao, (卜涛; born 1983 in Xi'an, Shaanxi, China) is a Chinese baseball player who is a left-handed pitcher
 Bu Hua (卜桦; born 1973) a digital artist based in Beijing, China, best known for her flash animation works
 Bu Xin (Chinese: 卜鑫; born 17 May 1987 in Tangshan) is a Chinese football player who currently plays for China League One side Guangdong South China Tiger
 Michał Boym (Chinese: 卜彌格; pinyin: Bǔ Mígé; c. 1612 – 1659) was a Polish Jesuit missionary to China, scientist and explorer. He was an early Western
 Bu Shang (卜商, 507–c. 420 BC), commonly known by his courtesy name Zixia or as Buzi (Master Bu), was an ancient Chinese philosopher and a prominent disciple
 Bu Wancang (卜萬蒼, 1900 – 1973), also known by his English name Richard Poh, was a prolific Chinese film director and screenwriter
 Boh Soon Ho (卜顺和; born 1968), Malaysian cafeteria worker and convicted murderer

References

Individual Chinese surnames